The family Alligatoridae of crocodylians includes alligators, caimans and their extinct relatives.

Phylogeny

The superfamily Alligatoroidea includes all crocodilians (fossil and extant) that are more closely related to the American alligator than to either the Nile crocodile or the gharial. This is a stem-based definition for alligators, and is more inclusive than the crown group Alligatoridae.  As a crown group, Alligatoridae only includes the last common ancestor of all extant (living) alligators, caimans, and their descendants (living or extinct), whereas Alligatoroidea, as a stem-based group, also includes more basal extinct alligator ancestors that are more closely related to living alligators than to crocodiles or gavialids. When considering only living taxa (neontology), this makes Alligatoroidea and Alligatoridae redundant.

The simplified cladogram below shows Alligatoridae's relationships to other extant (living) crocodilians.

The below detailed cladogram shows one proposal for the internal relationships within Alligatoridae (although the exact alligatoroid phylogeny is still disputed).

Evolution
The superfamily Alligatoroidea is thought to have split from the crocodile-gharial lineage in the late Cretaceous, about 87 million years ago. Leidyosuchus of Alberta is the earliest known genus. Fossil alligatoroids have been found throughout Eurasia as land bridges across both the North Atlantic and the Bering Strait have connected North America to Eurasia during the Cretaceous, Paleogene, and Neogene periods. Alligators and caimans split in North America during the early Tertiary or late Cretaceous (about 53 million to about 65 million years ago) and the latter reached South America by the Paleogene, before the closure of the Isthmus of Panama during the Neogene period. The Chinese alligator split from the American alligator about 33 million years ago and likely descended from a lineage that crossed the Bering land bridge during the Neogene. The modern American alligator is well represented in the fossil record of the Pleistocene. The alligator's full mitochondrial genome was sequenced in the 1990s. The full genome, published in 2014, suggests that the alligator evolved much more slowly than mammals and birds.

True alligators 
The lineage including alligators proper (Alligatorinae) occurs in the fluvial deposits of the age of the Upper Chalk in Europe, where they did not die out until the Pliocene age. The true alligators are today represented by two species, A. mississippiensis in the southeastern United States, which can grow to 15.6 ft (4.6 m) and weigh 1000 lbs(453 kg), with unverified sizes of up to 19.2 ft(5.9 m). And the small A. sinensis in the Yangtze River, China, which grows to an average of 5 ft (1.5 m). Their name derives from the Spanish el lagarto, which means "the lizard".

Caimans 

In Central and South America, the alligator family is represented by six species of the subfamily Caimaninae, which differ from the alligator by the absence of a bony septum between the nostrils, and having ventral armour composed of overlapping bony scutes, each of which is formed of two parts united by a suture. Besides the three species in Caiman, the smooth-fronted caimans in genus Paleosuchus and the black caiman in Melanosuchus are described. Caimans tend to be more agile and crocodile-like in their movements, and have longer, sharper teeth than alligators.

The largest is the near-threatened Melanosuchus niger, the jacaré-açu or large or black caiman of the Amazon River basin. The black caiman and American alligator are the only members of the alligator family that pose the same danger to humans as the larger species of the crocodile family.

Although caimans have not been studied in depth, scientists have learned their mating cycles (previously thought to be spontaneous or year-round) are linked to the rainfall cycles and the river levels, which increases chances of survival for their offspring.

Taxonomy 
† = extinct

 Family Alligatoridae
 Subfamily Alligatorinae
 Genus Alligator
 † Alligator hailensis
 † Alligator mcgrewi
 † Alligator mefferdi
 Alligator mississippiensis, American alligator
 † Alligator olseni
 † Alligator prenasalis
 Alligator sinensis, Chinese alligator
 † Alligator thomsoni
 Genus † Allognathosuchus
 Genus † Arambourgia
 Genus † Ceratosuchus
 Genus † Chrysochampsa
 Genus † Eoalligator
 Genus † Hassiacosuchus
 Genus † Krabisuchus
 Genus † Navajosuchus?
 Genus † Procaimanoidea
 Genus † Wannaganosuchus
 Subfamily Caimaninae
 Genus † Acresuchus
 Genus † Bottosaurus
 Genus Caiman
 † Caiman brevirostris
 Caiman crocodilus, Spectacled caiman
 Caiman latirostris, Broad-snouted caiman
 † Caiman lutescans
 † Caiman venezuelensis
 † Caiman wannlangstoni
 Caiman yacare, Yacare caiman
 Genus † Centenariosuchus
 Genus † Chinatichampsus
 Genus † Culebrasuchus
 Genus † Eocaiman
 Genus † Globidentosuchus
 Genus † Gnatusuchus
 Genus † Kuttanacaiman
 Genus Melanosuchus
 † Melanosuchus fisheri
 Melanosuchus niger, Black caiman
 Genus † Mourasuchus
 Genus † Necrosuchus
 Genus † Orthogenysuchus
 Genus Paleosuchus
 Paleosuchus palpebrosus, Cuvier's dwarf caiman
 Paleosuchus trigonatus, Smooth-fronted caiman
 Genus † Protocaiman
 Genus † Purussaurus
 Genus † Tsoabichi

References

External links 
"Crocodilians: Natural History & Conservation" crocodilian.com
"Family Alligatoridae Gray 1844 (alligator)", fossilworks.org.

 
Taxa named by John Edward Gray
Reptile families
Extant Campanian first appearances